Guacara is a city in Carabobo State, Venezuela, seat of Guacara Municipality.

It was officially founded 1624, although it was already a settlement of indigenous people. It has an estimated population for July 2009 of 178,000 inhabitants. It is located northeast of Lake Valencia and has a river, the Vigirima River, which empties into the lake. It is connected to the Caracas-Valencia motorway and is 12 km from the city of Valencia.

Cities in Carabobo
Populated places established in 1624
1624 establishments in the Spanish Empire